This is a list of official and unofficial U.S. state fishes: 


See also
 List of U.S. state, district, and territorial insignia
 Lists of United States state symbols#Flora and fauna

Notes

References

 Netstate.com state fish tables

External links

.State
Fish
.